The 1987 NCAA Division I-AA Football Championship Game was a postseason college football game between the Northeast Louisiana Indians (now the Louisiana–Monroe Warhawks) and the Marshall Thundering Herd. The game was played on December 19, 1987, at the Minidome (now known as Holt Arena) in Pocatello, Idaho. The culminating game of the 1987 NCAA Division I-AA football season, it was won by Northeast Louisiana, 43–42.

Teams
The participants of the Championship Game were the finalists of the 1987 I-AA Playoffs, which began with a 16-team bracket.

Northeast Louisiana Indians

Northeast Louisiana finished their regular season with a 9–2 record (6–0 in conference); one of their losses was to the Ragin' Cajuns of the then University of Southwestern Louisiana, a Division I-A program. Ranked third in the final NCAA I-AA in-house poll and seeded second in the tournament, the Indians defeated North Texas State, Eastern Kentucky, and third-seed Northern Iowa to reach the final. This was the first appearance for Northeast Louisiana in a Division I-AA championship game.

Marshall Thundering Herd

Marshall finished their regular season with a 7–4 record (4–2 in conference); one of their losses was to Ohio of Division I-A. Ranked 14th in the final NCAA I-AA in-house poll and unseeded in the tournament, the Thundering Herd defeated James Madison, Weber State, and top-seed Appalachian State to reach the final. This was also the first appearance for Marshall in a Division I-AA championship game.

Game summary

Scoring summary

Game statistics

References

Further reading

External links
 National Champions plaque on display at Malone Stadium via Yelp

 
Championship Game
NCAA Division I Football Championship Games
Louisiana–Monroe Warhawks football games
Marshall Thundering Herd football games
American football in Idaho
Sports in Pocatello, Idaho
Sports competitions in Idaho
NCAA Division I-AA Football Championship Game
NCAA Division I-AA Football Championship Game